Ancylosis pallida is a species of snout moth in the genus Ancylosis. It was described by Staudinger, in 1870, and is known from Russia, Romania and Greece.

The wingspan is 23–24 mm.

References

Moths described in 1870
pallida
Moths of Europe